This is a list of Norwegian radio stations or stations that broadcast for a Norwegian language audience.

Radio stations

Public radio stations broadcasting in analogue 

Note:These major radio stations will shut broadcasts via FM and be digital during 2017.

NRK's regional broadcasting 
Part of the program services of NRK P1

See List of Norwegian Broadcasting Corporations regional broadcasts

Current FM band in Oslo 
The following radio stations are located in and transmitted from Oslo, Norway. There are 17 radio stations in Oslo.

 90.1 FM - 901 ROX
 99.3 FM - Radio Nova
 104.8 FM - The Beat
 105.8 FM - RLA 105.8 (RLA - Radio Latin Amerika)
 106.8 FM - Radio Metro (Also FM available in some other Norwegian major cities)

Digital Radio Stations

NRK 

 NRK 5.1
 NRK Alltid Nyheter - 24/7 news
 NRK Båtvær - 24/7 weather forecast on DAB only
 NRK Folkemusikk - 24/7 Traditional Norwegian folk music
 NRK P1+ - A spinoff of P1, targeting a mature audience
 NRK P13 - 24/7 rock and indie music
 NRK Jazz
 NRK Klassisk - 24/7 classical music
 NRK mP3 - 24/7 dance music (also called mP3)
 NRK Sápmi - in Sami languages
 NRK Sport - 24/7 sports channel
 NRK Stortinget - broadcasts when parliament (Storting) is in session.
 NRK Super - 24/7 for children
 NRK P3 National Rap Show - 24/7 Rap music
 NRK P3 Pyro - 24/7 the "hardest parts" of rock music
 NRK P3 Radioresepsjonen - 24/7 humorous talk show in Norwegian
 NRK P3 Urørt - 24/7 untouched music (not previously played on the radio)

Commercial 
The following nationwide radio stations are privately owned and broadcast commercial breaks.

Run by P4 

NRJ (Norway)
P5 Hits
P6 Rock
P7 Klem
P8 Pop
P9 Retro
P10 Country
P11 Bandit

Run by Radio Norge 

 Kiss & Dance
 Norsk Pop
 Radio Rock
 Radio Soft
 Topp 40
 Vinyl

Others 
 Ordentlig Radio
 RADIO NORWAY DIRECT - 24/7 English Language Radio in Norway Music News and Comment
 VOXLO RADIO - First 24/7 Multi Ethnic Radio in Norway - Music, Lifestyle and Culture - www.voxloradio.com

Regional radio stations 
These stations are available in several larger Norwegian cities

 Radio Metro
 The Beat

Local radio stations 

 1 FM Molde
 Askøy lokal
 Bjørnefjord Nærkringkasting
 Bygderadio Vest
 Bykle Radio
 Båtsfjord Radio
 City Radio & TV
 Den Frie Evangel. Fors. Radio
 Drangedal Nærradio
 Ekko Radio
 ETS-Radioen
 Favorite FM
 Filadelfia Radio
 FM1 Romerike
 Gimlekollen Radio
 Gnisten Radio, Bergen
 Godt Nytt Radio
 Guovdageinnu Lagasradio
 Halden Nærradio
 Hallo Kragerø
 Hallo Sogn
 Havøysund Nærradio
 Hjalarhornet Radio
 Hjerteradioen
 Horten Nærradio HNR
 Håpets Røst
 Innlandet Nærradio
 Islandsradioen
 Jæren misjonsradio
 JærRadioen
 Kanal 1 Drammen
 Kanal 1 Elverum
 Kanal 1 Nesodden
 Kanal 7 Bergen
 Kanal 7 Oslo
 Klem FM
 Kontakt Radio
 Kristenradio Tønsberg
 Kystradioen, Askøy
 Kystradioen, Bergen
 Lindesnes Nærradio
 LiquidFM
 Lofotradioen
 Malecón Radio
 Magic Weekend
 Mediekultur Radio
 Meldal Radio
 Misjonsradioen, Sandefjord
 Mistberget Radio
 Mjøsradioen
 Morgenradioen
 Moskenesradioen
 Møtet med Jesus nærradio
 Narvik Studentradio
 NB Radio
 NEA Radio
 Nesna Radio
 NKK Radio
 Norddals-Radioen
 Nordfjord Nærradio
 Norea Radio Oslo
 Norrøna Radio Molde
 Norrøna Radio, Volda/Ørsta
 Norrøna Radio, Ålesund
 NRJ Energy
 Nye Radio Larvik
 Nytt Liv Media
 Nærkanalen
 Ottadalsradioen
 P5 Fosen
 P5 Ringerike
 P5 Solungen
 P7-Kristen Riksradio
 PVest Sogn og Fjordane
 Radio 1 Bergen
 Radio 1 Oslo
 Radio 1 Stavanger
 Radio 1 Trondheim
 Radio 102
 Radio 3 Bodø
 Radio 3 Rana
 Radio 5
 Radio 7
 Radio Acem
 Radio Adressa
 Radio Aftenbladet
 Radio Alta
 Radio Arbeidet
 Radio Arco Iris
 Radio Atlantic
 Radio Bardufoss
 Radio Beiarn
 Radio Bergenhus
 Radio Betel
 Radio Bø
 Radio City
 Radio Doaivu
 Radio Domen
 Radio Drammen
 Radio DSF
 Radio E6
 Radio Evje
 Radio Fana
 Radio Filadelfia, Drammen
 Radio Filadelfia, Kristiansand
 Radio Fitjar
 Radio Folgefonn
 Radio Follo
 Radio Fosen
 Radio Fredrikstad
 Radio Glåmdal
 Radio Gnisten
 Radio Godt Nytt
 Radio Grenland
 Radio Grimstad
 Radio Groruddalen
 Radio Hallingdal
 Radio Hamar
 Radio Hammerfest
 Radio Harstad
 Radio Haugaland
 Radio Helgeland
 Radio Horisont
 Radio Hurum og Røyken A/L
 Radio Hålogaland
 Radio Inter FM
 Radio Internasjonal
 Radio Islam Ahmadiyya
 Radio Karlsøy
 Radio Kongsvinger
 Radio Korgen
 Radio Kristiania
 Radio Kristiansand
 Radio Kvinesdal
 Radio L Lillesand Nærradio
 Radio Laagen
 Radio Latin-Amerika
 Radio Lierne
 Radio Loland A/L
 Radio Luster
 Radio Lyngdal
 Radio Lødingen
 Radio Maran Ata
 Radio Mehamn A/L
 Radio Melbu
 Radio Midt-Telemark
 Radio Midt-Troms A/S
 Radio Midt-Trøndelag
 Radio Midt-Østerdal
 Radio Modum
 Radio Mosjøen
 Radio Moss
 Radio Narvik
 Radio Naustloftet
 Radio New Life
 Radio Nord
 Radio Nord-Salten
 Radio Nordkapp
 Radio Nordsjø
 Radio Nova
 Radio Oslo
 Radio Osterøy
 Radio P5
 Radio Porsanger
 Radio PR
 Radio PS
 Radio På sporet
 Radio R 35
 Radio Randsfjord
 Radio Rauma
 Radio Reboot
 Radio Risør
 Radio Rjukan
 Radio Røst
 Radio Salem
 Radio Salten
 Radio Sandnes
 Radio Sara
 Radio Sarpsborg
 Radio Sentrum, Oslo
 Radio Sentrum, Trondheim
 Radio Sentrum, Ålesund
 Radio Ski
 Radio Skjeberg
 Radio Solør Våler Nærradio
 Radio Sotra
 Radio Stavanger
 Radio Storfjord
 Radio Stryn
 Radio Sunnhordland
 Radio Søgne
 Radio Sør-Helgeland
 Radio Tabernaklet
 Radio Tamil Murasam
 Radio Tamil, Bergen
 Radio Tamil, Ålesund
 Radio Tango
 Radio Telemark
 Radio Toten
 Radio Tri
 Radio Tromsø
 Radio Tønsberg
 Radio Ung
 Radio Vaksdal
 Radio Vega AL
 Radio Vest-Telemark
 Radio Vika
 Radio Visjon
 Radio Volda
 Radio Voz Latina
 Radio Værøy
 Radio Ytringen
 Radio Ålesund
 Radio Øksnes
 Radio Øst
 Radio+ Lillehammer og Gjøvik
 Radio-PX
 Radiodigital 80 tallet
 radiOrakel
 Radios
 Radium
 Romerike Radio
 Sandefjord Radio
 Scandinavian Satellite Radio
 Skjervøy Nærradio
 Stage Radio
 Studentradioen i Bergen
 Sunnmørsposten
 Teipen Radio
 Telerosa Radio
 Tellus Radio
 Tyrifjord Radio Kanal 7
 Valdres Radio
 Varanger Radio
 Vekkelsesradio'n
 VOXLO RADIO
 Østlandets Kanal 1

Coast radio stations 
Tjøme radio (LGT)
Rogaland radio (LGB)
Florø radio (LGL)
Bodø radio (LGP)
Vardø radio (LGV)
Svalbard radio (LGS)

References 

Radio stations in Norway
Radio
Norwegian